Russian State Specialized Academy of Arts (RSSAA; , often abbreviated РГСАИ) is a coeducational and public research university located in Moscow, Russia. — higher education institution preparing theatre actors, artists and musicians. Specializes in teaching students with disabilities.

History
Russian State Specialized Academy of Arts is former State Specialized Institute of Arts (SSIA) which was established in 1991. The Institute was granted the Academy status in 2014. The Academy is the only higher educational establishment in the world that provides people with limited physical abilities to have higher education in the arts: music, theatre and painting. The idea of inclusive education is being implemented at the Academy for more than 20 years. Modern education methods and student composition promote this educational form.

Campus
The four-storey building of the Academy was built in the early 1950s according to the standard project of L. A. Stepanova. Initially, it housed School 96 of Kievsky district of Moscow.

Faculties and departments
List of faculties and departments of the Russian State Specialized Academy of Arts (RSSAA)

Faculty of fine arts 
The faculty trains academic easel painters and graphic artists, as well as environmental designers.

Department of painting and graphics
 Easel painting workshop 
 Workshop of easel graphics 
 Workshop linocut and etching 
 Academic sculpture workshop

Department of environmental design
 Ceramics workshop
 Computer Design Workshop

Musical faculty 
The faculty trains vocalists, performers and sound engineers.

Department of instrumental performance
 special piano
 flute
 accompaniment class, chamber ensemble
 clarinet
 pipe
 trombone

Department of Opera training

Department of Opera singing

Department of folk instruments
 accordion
 balalaika

Department of Theory and History of Music

Department of musical sound engineering, acoustics and computer science

Opera theatre

Theater faculty 
The faculty trains actors of drama, Comedy and mimic theatre, as well as masters of artistic expression.

Department of acting

Department of plastic expressiveness

The Department of scenic speech and the surdopedagogy chair

Laboratory of sign language and sign language

Inter-faculty Department of Humanities

Teaching staff 
The teaching staff consists of about 100 people

Professors 
 Alexander Yakupov, Doctor of arts, Honored art worker of the Russian Federation, Rector;

Opera theatre 
The Grand opening of the Opera house of RSSAA was presented by a gala concert of students and graduates of Faculty of Music on December 18, 2012 . Musical Director of the theater and Conductor is Alexander Yakupov, Honored Artist of the Russian Federation, Professor, Rector of RSSAA . 
 The premiere of Alexander Dargomyzhsky's Opera "Stone guest" took place on December 19, 2012 
 The premiere of Pyotr Ilyich Tchaikovsky's Opera "Iolanta" took place on December 26, 2013.

Transport connections 
 Metro:  Studencheskaya station

See also
Education in Russia
List of early modern universities in Europe
List of universities in Russia

Notes and references

External links

 
 The President visited the Russian state specialized Academy of arts. 
 Russian state specialized Academy of arts — RGSAI in Moscow 

Buildings and structures built in the Soviet Union
Universities in Moscow
Public universities and colleges in Russia
Cultural heritage monuments in Moscow